Hurricane Electric is a global Internet service provider offering internet transit, tools, and network applications, as well as data center colocation and hosting services at two locations in Fremont, California, where the company is based.

According to its own data, Hurricane Electric is the largest global IP network as measured by network adjacencies in both IPv4 and IPv6. It is also the largest global IP network as measured by IPv6 prefixes announced, and the fifth-largest global IP network as measured by IPv4 prefixes announced, according to its own data.

IPv6
Hurricane Electric operates the largest Internet Protocol version 4 (IPv4) and Internet Protocol version 6 (IPv6) transit networks globally, as measured by the count of peering interconnections to other networks. The majority of these adjacencies are native IPv6 BGP sessions.

Hurricane Electric offers an IPv6 tunnel broker service, providing free connectivity to the IPv6 Internet via 6in4 IPv6 transition mechanisms. The company provides an online IPv6 certification program to further education and compliance in IPv6 technology. As of June 21, 2020, the company reports 76,110 provisioned tunnels spanning 196 countries via the IPv6 tunnel broker. 17,707 individuals in 165 countries have reached the highest level of the IPv6 certification.

Peering
Within its global network, Hurricane Electric is connected to more than 295 major exchange points and exchanges IP traffic directly with more than 10,600 different networks. Hurricane Electric currently has 23+ Terabits per second active public peering capacity and 200+ Terabits per second active private peering capacity.

The European Internet Exchange Association (Euro-IX) ranks Hurricane Electric first in the world for the number of connections to Internet exchange points, with presence at more than 155 of Euro-IX member IXPs.

Peering dispute
There is a long-running dispute between the provider Cogent Communications and Hurricane Electric. Cogent has been refusing to peer settlement-free with Hurricane Electric since 2009.

References

External links
 Hurricane Electric IPv6 tunnel broker service

Companies based in Fremont, California
Data centers
Internet service providers of the United States
Internet service providers
IPv6
Technology companies based in the San Francisco Bay Area
American companies established in 1994
Technology companies established in 1994